Dwight Hamilton Baldwin (September 15, 1821 – August 23, 1899) was a piano manufacturer in the United States, famous as the eponym and introducer of the Baldwin Piano.

Born in Erie County, Pennsylvania, Baldwin began his career as a teacher of the reed organ and violin. He opened a music store in Cincinnati, Ohio in 1862, and became one of the biggest sellers of pianos in the Midwest. Along with inventor John Warren Macy, Baldwin created the first Baldwin piano in 1891, and introduced a grand piano in 1895. He died in Cincinnati, Ohio, at the age of 78.

External links

Dwight Hamilton Baldwin in geni.com

Piano makers
1821 births
1899 deaths